Walter Hummel may refer to:

 Walter Hummel (athlete) (1892–1978), American athlete
 Walter Hummel (musicologist) (1883–1968), Austrian musicologist